This is list of notable Slovene Americans, including both original immigrants who obtained American citizenship and their American descendants.

To be included in this list, the person must have a Wikipedia article showing they are Slovene American or must have references showing they are Slovene American and are notable.

List

Entertainment

Actors 
 David Boreanaz - Actor
 Ami Dolenz – actor
 George Dolenz – actor
 Micky Dolenz – actor, musician (Drummer/Singer of The Monkees)
 Frank Gorshin – actor
 Melissa Joan Hart – actress
 Željko Ivanek – Emmy Award-winning actor
 Lana Rhoades - actress
 Audrey Totter – actress
 Patrick Warburton – actor (his father is of Slovenian ancestry)

Comedy 
 Anthony Jeselnik – comedian

Musicians 
 Karen Kamensek – orchestral and operatic conductor
 Joey Miskulin – Grammy Award-winning musician and record producer
 Frankie Yankovic – Grammy Award-winning musician, known as "America's Polka King", popularized Slovenian-style polka
 "Weird Al" Yankovic – Comedy performer known for his parodies of popular music.

Sports 
 Mike Adamle – American football player – Northwestern Wildcats and NFL – also a television and radio sports reporter and WWE wrestling announcer
 Tony Adamle – American football player – Ohio State Buckeyes and Cleveland Browns (member of 1950 and 1954 NFL Championship teams)
Jeff Blatnick – Olympic champion in freestyle wrestling
 Frank Brimsek – ice hockey player
 Luka Dončić - professional basketball player for the Dallas Mavericks and the Slovenian National Team
 Bryant Dunston – professional basketball player for the Slovenian national team since he acquired Slovenian citizenship in 2015
 Bob Golic – American football player (Notre Dame Fighting Irish and NFL – Cleveland Browns, among other teams) – also an actor Saved by the Bell: The College Years
 Mike Golic – American football player (Notre Dame Fighting Irish and NFL – Philadelphia Eagles, among other teams) – also ESPN radio personality and host on Mike and Mike in the Morning
 Randy Gradishar – American football player (Ohio State Buckeyes and Denver Broncos)
 John Gruden – ice hockey player
 Eric Heiden – Olympic speed skater, winner of five gold medals at the 1980 Winter Olympics
 Luke Hochevar – Major League Baseball pitcher
 Frank Hribar – NFL Washington Redskins
 Wally Judnich – baseball player
 Anže Kopitar – ice hockey player Los Angeles Kings, team captain and two-time Stanley Cup winner 
 Joe Kuhel – baseball player and manager
 Les Kuntar – ice hockey player
 Trajan Langdon – basketball (NBA and Europe) player
 Dan Majerle – basketball (NBA) player
 Ariel McDonald – former basketball player who played for the Slovenian national team in 2001 since he acquired citizenship, 2000 Israeli Basketball Premier League MVP
 Ken Novak – American football player
 Anton Peterlin – soccer player
 Anthony Randolph – basketball (NBA and Europe) player
 Peter Vidmar – gymnast, U.S. team captain and winner of two gold medals and a silver medal in the 1984 Olympics, was the highest scoring gymnast in U.S. history (with a 9.89 average)
 Fritzie Zivic – boxer
 Mark Zupan – athlete, wheelchair rugby team captain

Journalists 
 Jim Klobuchar – author and journalist
 Charles Kuralt – journalist

Academic and scientific 
 Richard Carl Fuisz – inventor
 Rado Lenček – linguist, ethnologist, cultural historian
 Jerry Michael Linenger – astronaut
 Anton Mavretič – NASA
 Ronald Sega – astronaut
 Joseph Velikonja – professor of geography
 Sunita Williams – astronaut

Military 
 Ferdinand J. Chesarek – general
 Frank Gorenc – general
 Stanley Gorenc – general
 John S. Lekson – United States Army Major General
 Rudolf Perhinek – captain
 Ronald Zlatoper – admiral

Politicians 
 John Blatnik – Congressman United States House of Representatives
 Joe Cimperman – Cleveland, Ohio City Councilman and 2008 candidate for the United States House of Representatives
 Dennis Eckart – public and cultural worker; US Congressman
 Paul Gosar – Congressman
 Tom Harkin – United States Senator
 Amy Klobuchar – United States Senator
 Raymond P. Kogovsek – Congressman
 Frank Lausche – Mayor of Cleveland, Ohio, United States Senator and Governor of Ohio
 James Oberstar – Congressman
 Philip Ruppe – Congressman
 George Voinovich – Mayor of Cleveland, Ohio, United States Senator, and Governor of Ohio
 Cheri Pierson Yecke – politician, academic

Religious 
 Friderik Irenej Baraga (Frederic Baraga) – Roman Catholic Bishop and Missionary
 Elden Francis Curtiss – former Roman Catholic Archbishop of Omaha, Nebraska and former Bishop of Helena, Montana
 Ignatius Mrak – Roman Catholic bishop
 Francis Xavier Pierz – Roman Catholic bishop

Writers 
 Louis Adamič – author
 Andrew Anžur Clement — author
 Tea Obreht – author
 Rose Mary Prosen – poet

Others 
 Joe Kenda – detective lieutenant and TV producer
 Santino William Legan - perpetrator of the Gilroy Garlic Festival Shooting
 Joe Sutter – manager of the design team for the Boeing 747
 Melania Trump – former First Lady of the United States, wife of 45th U.S. President Donald Trump and fashion model

References 

Gobetz, E. 2009. Slovenians made a difference in America and the World. Slovenian American Times, Vol. 1, Issue 7, Pages 1; 15. 23 May 2009.

 
Slovenian
Americans
Slovenian